Anna of Cleves (1 March 1552, Cleves – 6 October 1632, Höchstädt an der Donau) was a daughter of Duke William V of Jülich-Berg and his wife, Maria of Austria.

She married on 27 September 1574 in Neuburg with Count Palatine Philip Louis of Neuburg. They had the following children:
Countess Palatine Anna Maria of Neuburg (18 August 1575 – 11 February 1643), married on 9 September 1591 to Frederick Wilhelm I, Duke of Saxe-Weimar.
Dorothea Sabine (13 October 1576 – 12 December 1598). Her burial gown is one of the few complete women's garments from the sixteenth century to have survived and is preserved in the Bayerisches National Museum in Munich.
Wolfgang Wilhelm, Count Palatine of Neuburg (25 October 1578 – 20 March 1653), married:
 in 1613 Magdalene of Bavaria (1587–1628)
 in 1631 Countess Palatine Catharina Charlotte of Zweibrücken (1615–1651)
 in 1651 Countess Maria Francisca of Fürstenberg (1633–1702)
Otto Henry (28 October 1580 – 2 March 1581)
Augustus, Count Palatine of Sulzbach (2 October 1582 – 14 August 1632), married:
 in 1620 Hedwig of Schleswig-Holstein-Gottorp (1603–1657)
Amalia Hedwig (24 December 1584 – 15 August 1607)
John Frederick, Count Palatine of Sulzbach-Hilpoltstein (23 August 1587 – 19 October 1644), married:
 in 1624 Agnes of Hesse-Darmstadt (1604–1664), daughter of Louis V
Sophie Barbara (3 April 1590 – 21 December 1591)

References 

 Andreas Thiele: Erzählende genealogische Stammtafeln zur europäischen Geschichte. Band I, Teilband 2: Deutsche Kaiser-, Königs-, Herzogs- und Grafenhäuser II. Fischer, Frankfurt am Main 1994, Tafel 485
 Siegrid Westphal: Konversion und Bekenntnis. Konfessionelle Handlungsfelder der Fürstinwitwe Anna im Zuge der Rekatholisierung Pfalz-Neuburgs zwischen 1614 und 1632. In: Vera von der Osten-Sacken, Daniel Gerth (Hrsg.): Fürstinnen und Konfession. Beiträge hochadeliger Frauen zu Religionspolitik und Bekenntnisbildung. Veröffentlichungen des Instituts für Europäische Geschichte, Mainz, Beihefte, Band 104, Vandenhoeck & Ruprecht, Göttingen 2015, p. 317

1552 births
1632 deaths
16th-century German people
17th-century German people
Duchesses of Jülich
Duchesses of Cleves
Duchesses of Berg
Countesses Palatine of Neuburg
House of La Marck